Bruchhausen-Vilsen is a Samtgemeinde ("collective municipality") in the district of Diepholz, in Lower Saxony, Germany. Its seat is in Bruchhausen-Vilsen.

The Samtgemeinde Bruchhausen-Vilsen consists of the following municipalities:

 Asendorf 
 Bruchhausen-Vilsen
 Martfeld 
 Schwarme 

Samtgemeinden in Lower Saxony